Mocchi (formerly Luciana Mocchi Cavelli; born 8 June 1990) is a Uruguayan singer and composer.

Biography
Lu Mocchi was born in Montevideo, where they began their musical training at age eight. They attended piano lessons at the Virgilio Scarabelli Alberti School and continued at the W. Kolischer Conservatory. At age thirteen they began playing guitar and bass, and joined various bands in which they participated as a guitarist, bassist, and vocalist.

The following year they received the same prize and a unique mention for composition.

Thanks to the Chilean musician Edgardo "Yayo" Serka, drummer for the Mexican singer Lila Downs, they made several appearances and a tour in the United States, with musicians based in that country, among them Serka and the Mexican bassist Luis Guzmán, also from Downs' band.

In 2011, urged by singer and producer Lea Ben Sasson, they began recording La Velocidad del paisaje, their first studio material, preproduced by Martín Musotto, brother of the Argentine percussionist . The album also had the special participation of "Yayo" Serka and Luis Guzmán. It was recorded live in different studios in Montevideo and Buenos Aires, and includes eleven songs written by Mocchi.

In April 2014 they were the opening act for Paul McCartney at the Estadio Centenario in Montevideo, which was a turning point in the visibility of their career.

Mocchi was the executive producer of the documentary Botija de mi país (2013), which deals with the careers of ten Uruguayan musicians established in the United States, including José Serebrier, who was nominated 38 times for Grammy Awards, and won eight.

It was produced by Esteban Pesce.

Mocchi is a transgender person.

Discography
 La velocidad del paisaje (2013)
 Mañana será otro disco (2016)

References

External links
 
 

1990 births
Living people
Singers from Montevideo
Uruguayan bass guitarists
Uruguayan composers
21st-century Uruguayan women singers
21st-century bass guitarists
Transgender women musicians
Uruguayan transgender people
Uruguayan LGBT singers
Transgender composers
Transgender singers